Peter Gudauskas (October 19, 1916 – October 27, 2003) was an American football guard who played four seasons in the National Football League with the Cleveland Rams and Chicago Bears and two seasons in the American Football League with the Cincinnati Bengals. He played college football at Murray State University.

College career
Gudauskas played for the Murray State Racers from 1936 to 1939. In 1938, he was named to the Little All-America and All-Southern Intercollegiate Athletic Association teams. He was also named to the All-Kentucky Intercollegiate Athletic Conference team in 1937, 1938 and 1939. Gudauskas was inducted into the Murray State Athletics Hall of Fame in 1970.

Professional career
Gudauskas played in one game for the Cleveland Rams in 1940, two seasons for the Cincinnati Bengals in 1940 and 1941 and two seasons for the Chicago Bears from 1943 to 1945.

References

External links
Just Sports Stats

1916 births
2003 deaths
Players of American football from Illinois
American football guards
Murray State Racers football players
Cleveland Rams players
Chicago Bears players
People from Georgetown, Illinois